Phosphatidylinositol 4-kinase 2-alpha is an enzyme that in humans is encoded by the PI4K2A gene.

Classification 

This gene encodes a phosphatidylinositol 4-kinase which catalyzes phosphorylation of phosphatidylinositol at the D-4 position, yielding phosphatidylinositol 4-phosphate (PI4P). Besides the fact, that PI4P serves as a precursor for other important phosphoinositides, such as phosphatidylinositol 4,5-bisphosphate, PI4P is an essential molecule in the cellular signaling and trafficking especially in the Golgi apparatus and the trans Golgi network.

Phosphatidylinositol 4-kinases are evolutionary conserved among eukaryotes and include four human isoforms
 phosphatidylinositol 4-kinase alpha (PI4KA)
 phosphatidylinositol 4-kinase beta (PI4KB)
 phosphatidylinositol 4-kinase 2-alpha (PI4K2A)
 phosphatidylinositol 4-kinase 2-beta (PI4K2B)

Function 

Phosphatidylinositol 4-kinase 2-alpha (PI4K2A) is the most abundant phosphatidylinositol 4-kinase in human cells and is responsible for the synthesis of approximately 50% of the total PI4P within the cell. PI4K2A is associated mainly with the membranes of the trans Golgi network and early and late endosomes; its membrane association is achieved by a heavy palmitoylation within a specific cysteine-rich motif. Besides the synthesis of phosphatidylinositol 4,5-bisphosphate, PI4K2A is involved in various cell processes including membrane trafficking, regulation of endosomal sorting promoting target protein recruitment to endosomes or trans Golgi network, or signal transduction. Particularly, it regulates e.g. targeting of clathrin adaptor complexes to the Golgi apparatus, EGFR signaling, or the Wnt signaling pathway. 

PI4K2A is important in lysosomal quality control. It is the first essential enzyme of the phosphoinositide-initiated membrane tethering and lipid transport (PITT) pathway for rapid lysosomal repair. Upon lysosomal membrane damage, PI4K2A is strongly recruited to lysosomes, leading to robust lysosomal PI4P production. Such lysosomal PI4K2A/PI4P signaling drives rapid lysosomal repair through extensive membrane contacts between the endoplasmic reticulum (ER) and damaged lysosomes as well as multiple ER-to-lysosomal lipid transfer processes. 

Pi4k2a gene trap mouse show pre-mature aging and neurodegeneration, with increased lipofuscin accumulation. PI4K2A-deleted patients have complex and severe developmental problems along with neurodegeneration.

Clinical significance 

Dysfunction of PI4K2A may contribute to tumour growth, spastic paraplegia, Gaucher's disease, or Alzheimer's disease.

Structure 

PI4K2A is composed of a proline-rich N-terminal region and a kinase domain located C-terminally. The proline-rich N-terminal region contains physiologically important binding sites for a ubiquitin ligase Itch  and clathrin adaptor complex 3, but is likely disordered and dispensable for the kinase activity. The kinase domain can be divided into N-terminal and C-terminal lobes with the ATP binding groove and putative phosphatidylinositol binding pocket in between. The C-lobe of the kinase domain contains an additional lateral hydrophobic pocket with no distinct function assigned yet.

References

Further reading